Panjis or Panji Prabandh are extensive genealogical records maintained among the Maithil Kayasthas and Maithil Brahmins of the Mithila region similar to the Hindu genealogy registers at Haridwar.

Utility
The Panjis have enormous value when arranging marriages, as they ensure that incestuous relationships do not occur, delineating the last 07 generations from the paternal side and 06 generations from the maternal side of the prospective bride and groom.

Saurath Sabha
The Maithil Kayasthas and Maithil  Brahmin delegates assembled in a conference to deliberate upon new marriage alliances duly checked with the respective  at a place near Madhubani of India called as Saurath. the conference itself was called Saurath Sabha .

Current status
Due to progressive loss of Panjis, Panjikars taking up modern professions and increasing cosmopolitan behaviour, the practice of fixation of marriage by consulting Panjis is dying. There have been cases reported of sale of Panjis to foreign agencies . The recent Saurath sabhas are all but deserted . Increasingly, people are looking forward to more modern methods of match making like internet, rather than centuries old palm leaves.

Books on Panji System
Maithili Karna Kayasthak Panjik Sarvekshan, by Binod Bihari Verma
Maithil Brāhamano ki Pañji Vyavasthā (Hindi), by Pt Ramānāth Jhā, published by Granthālaya, Darbhangā.
Genome Mapping- 450 AD to 2009 AD- Mithilak Panji Prabandh, by Gajendra Thakur, published by Shruti Publication, 2009 Delhi ISBN No.978-81-907729-6-9
Panji System in Maithil Karna Kayastha: A Sociological Evaluation, [By: Dr. Binod Kumar Karna.]

References

External links
Bihar government site about Mithila including Panjikars
A history of Panji system in North India
Times Of India article on Brahmins Panjis
JSTOR article on the usage of Panjis on Mithila and Bengal
Times of India article on Saurath Sabha in Madhubani
Kinship ritual and visual imagery in Mithila
Review of the book 'Panjik Sarvekshan'

Culture of Mithila
Family registers
Social history of India
Indian genealogy